The Laois Senior Hurling Championship is an annual hurling competition contested by top-tier Laois GAA clubs. The Laois County Board of the Gaelic Athletic Association has organised it since 1888.

Clough–Ballacolla (incl Ballygeehan) are the title holders (2022) defeating Camross in the Final and completing the club's first three-in-a-row since doing a five-in-a-row in 1918.

Honours
The trophy presented to the winners is the Bob O'Keefe Cup.

The winners of the Laois Senior Championship qualify to represent their county in the Leinster Senior Club Hurling Championship. They often do well there and Clough–Ballacolla were in the 2021 Leinster Final after winning the Laois Senior Hurling Championship. The winners can, in turn, go on to play in the All-Ireland Senior Club Hurling Championship.

List of finals
(r) = replay

Notes
† The colours attached to Skierke, Aghaboe, Harristown and Ballacolla are those of the current parish teams and not necessarily those of the actual team at the time.

Wins listed by club

Winning captains since 1950
 1950 Pat Norton Clonad
 1951 Michael Rigney Kyle
 1952 Jimmy Murray Errill
 1953 Andy Dunne Clonad
 1954 Andy Dunne Clonad
 1955 Lar Dunphy Cullohill
 1956 Christy O'Brien Borris-in-Ossory
 1957 Christy O'Brien Borris-in-Ossory
 1958 Andy Dunne Clonad
 1959 Fintan Lalor Camross
 1960 Christy O'Brien Borris-in-Ossory
 1961 Christy O'Brien Borris-in-Ossory
 1962 Jimmy Fennell Clonad
 1963 Fintan Lalor Camross
 1964 Mt. (Mog) O'Mahoney Cullohill
 1965 Tim Cuddy Camross
 1966 Tim Cuddy Camross
 1967 Tim Cuddy Camross
 1968 Ger Cuddy Camross
 1969 Ger Cuddy Camross
 1970 George Conroy Clonad
 1971 Jimmy Lyons Camross
 1972 Brendan Dollard Borris-in-Ossory
 1973 John Carroll Camross
 1974 Christy Donovan Camross
 1975 John O'Keefe Clonaslee
 1976 Martin Cuddy Camross
 1977 Paddy Dowling Camross
 1978 Sean Cuddy Camross
 1979 Michael Carroll Camross
 1980 Richard Maloney Camross
 1981 John Joe Ging Portlaoise
 1982 John Joe Ging Portlaoise
 1983 John Joe Ging Portlaoise
 1984 John Joe Ging Portlaoise
 1985 PJ Cuddy Camross
 1986 Joe Doran Camross
 1987 Sean Bergin Portlaoise
 1988 Alo Delaney Camross
 1989 John Bohane Portlaoise
 1990 Pat Carroll Camross
 1991 Seamus Plunkett Portlaoise
 1992 Pat Norton Clonad
 1993 Fintan Lalor Camross
 1994 Tom Delaney Camross
 1995 John O' Suillivan Castletown
 1996 Matt Collier Camross
 1997 Eamonn Kirwan Castletown
 1998 Niall Rigney Portlaoise
 1999 John Lyons Castletown
 2000 Pat Phelan Castletown
 2001 Fionan O'Suillivan Castletown
 2002 Paul Cuddy Castletown
 2003 David Cuddy Castletown
 2004 Joe Phelan Portlaoise
 2005 Robert Delaney Castletown
 2006 Liam Wynne Rathdowney–Errill
 2007 Fran Hogan Camrosss
 2008 John Purcell Rathdowney–Errill
 2009 Mick McEvoy Clough–Ballacolla
 2010 Liam Tynan Rathdowney–Errill
 2011 John A. Delaney Clough–Ballacolla 
 2012 Shane Dollard Rathdowney–Errill
 2013 Tomás Burke Camross
 2014 Alan Delaney Rathdowney–Errill
 2015 Darren Maher Clough–Ballacolla
 2016 Brian Stapleton Borris-in-Ossory–Kilcotton
 2017 Joe Phelan & Zane Keenan Camross 
 2018 Niall Homes Camross
 2019 Patrick Purcell Rathdowney–Errill
 2020 Stephen Maher Clough–Ballacolla
 2021 Stephen Maher Clough–Ballacolla
 2022 Stephen Maher Clough–Ballacolla

Records and statistics

Finals
 Most wins:
 26 Camross
 Most consecutive wins:
 5 Ballygeehan (1914–18), Camross (1965–69), Camross (1976–80) & Castletown (1999–2003)
 Most defeats:
 17 Portlaoise
 Most consecutive defeats:
 3 Abbeyleix (1946–48), Portlaoise (2007–09) & Borris-in-Ossory–Kilcotton (2019–21)
 Most appearances:
37 Camross
 Most appearances without a win:
4 Ballacolla (1898-1907-1923-1926)
 Highest scoring match:
64 points (2016) Borris-in-Ossory–Kilcotton 2-26 Rathdowney-Errill 2-26 (possible All Ireland record for 60-minute county SHC final)
 Lowest scoring match:
7 points (1928) Portlaoise 0-7 Clonad 1-0
 Biggest winning margin:
22 points (1911) Rathdowney 7-1 Clonaslee 0-0
 Highest scoring teams:
32 points (2016) Borris-in-Ossory–Kilcotton & Rathdowney-Errill
 Highest scoring winning team:
28 points (1968 & 1973) Camross
 Highest scoring losing team:
22 points (2017) Clough–Ballacolla
 Most goals match:
12 (1949) Abbeyleix 7-3 Clonad 5-3
 Fewest goals match:
0 (1914, 1975, 1998 & 2012d)
 Most goals team:
 7 (1935) Clonad & (1949) Abbeyleix
 Most goals losing team:
 5 (1949) Clonad
 Trivia:
 10 finals have ended in draws
 4 finals have been goalless (1914-1975-1998-2012r)
 20 finals have occurred where the losing team scored more goals than the winning team (last: 2019)
 3 finals have occurred where the winner scored two goals fewer than the losing team (1909-1981-1992)
 23 finals have occurred where there were more goals than points (last: 1964)

Teams

By decade
The most successful team of each decade, judged by number of Laois Senior Hurling Championship titles, is as follows:
 1880s: 2 for Rathdowney (1888–89)
 1890s: 2 each for Clonaslee (1890–91) and Rathdowney (1898–99) 
 1900s: 5 for Rathdowney (1901-02-03-07-08)
 1910s: 5 for Ballygeehan (1914-15-16-17-18)
 1920s: 4 for Rathdowney (1921-22-25-26)
 1930s: 4 for Clonad (1930-33-35-37)
 1940s: 4 for Abbeyleix (1940-44-45-49)
 1950s: 4 for Clonad (1950-53-54-58)
 1960s: 6 for Camross (1963-65-66-67-68-69)
 1970s: 7 for Camross (1971-73-74-76-77-78-79)
 1980s: 6 for Portlaoise (1981-82-83-84-87-89)
 1990s: 4 for Camross (1990-93-94-96)
 2000s: 5 for Castletown (2000-01-02-03-05)
 2010s: 4 for Rathdowney–Errill (2010-12-14-19)

Gaps
Top ten longest gaps between successive championship titles:
 91 years: Clough–Ballacolla (1918–2009) [as Ballygeehan in 1918]
 65 years: Clonaslee (1910–1975)
 38 years: Portlaoise (1943–1981)
 22 years: Clonad (1970–1992)
 19 years: Clonaslee (1891–1910)
 15 years: Portlaoise (1928–1943)
 14 years: Errill (1938–1952)
 11 years: Borris-in-Ossory (1961–1972)
 11 years: Camross (1996–2007)
 09 years: Rathdowney (1889–1898)
 09 years: Rathdowney (1912–1921)
 09 years: Clonad (1937–1946)
 09 years: Cullohill (1955–1964)

Starts (first 1–10 finals)

Best
1 final : (1-0) Rathdowney (1888), Clonaslee (1890), Harristown (1897), Ballygeehan (1914), Abbeyleix (1927), Mountrath (1942), Kyle (1951, Cullohill (1955), Borris-in-Ossory (1956), Castletown (1995), Rathdowney–Errill (2006)
2 finals: (2-0) Rathdowney (1889), Clonaslee (1891), Ballygeehan (1915), Abbeyleix (1932), Borris-in-Ossory (1957), Rathdowney-Errill (2008)
3 finals: (3-0) Ballygeehan (1916), Abbeyleix (1934), Rathdowney-Errill (2010)
4 finals: (4-0) Ballygeehan (1917), Rathdowney–Errill (2012)
5 finals: (5-0) Ballygeehan (1918), Rathdowney–Errill (2014)
6 finals: (5-1) (Ballygeehan (1919), Abbeyleix (1940), Castletown (2001), Rathdowney–Errill (2016)
7 finals: (6-1) Abbeyleix (1944), Castletown (2002)
8 finals: (7-1) Abbeyleix (1945), Castletown (2003)
9 finals: (7-2) Rathdowney (1903), Abbeyleix (1946), Castletown (2004)
10 finals: (8-2) Castletown (2005)

Worst
1 final : (0-1) Kilcotton (1888), Skierke (1889), Aghaboe (1891), Ballacolla (1898), Camross (1906), Portlaoise (1922), Clonad (1925), Errill (1933), Rovers (1951), Cuddagh (1957), Ballyfin (1972), Ballinakill (1979), The Harps (1984), Tinnahinch (2001), Borris-in-Ossory–Kilcotton (2013)
2 finals: (0-2) Kilcotton (1899), Ballacolla (1907), Clonad (1928), Camross (1945), Cuddagh (1959), The Harps (1997), Tinnahinch (2002)
3 finals: (0-3) Ballacolla (1923), Cuddagh (1961), The Harps (1998), Tinnahinch (2006)
4 finals: (0-4) Ballacolla (1926)
5 finals: (1-4) Clonad (1932), Borris-in-Ossory–Kilcotton (2021)
6 finals: (2-4) Clonad (1933), Errill (1954), Portlaoise (1977)
7 finals: (2-5) Clonad (1934), Portlaoise (1980), Errill (1982)
8 finals: (2-6) Errill (1986)
9 finals: (4-5) Clonad (1939), Clonaslee (1975), Portlaoise (1982)
10finals: (4-6) Clonad (1942), Clonaslee (1976), Portlaoise (1983)

Laois Senior A Hurling Championship

This competition has existed in various guises since 1995. It was originally played as the Dick Palmer Cup up to 2009, then became a competition ancillary to the main championship. In the earlier years, clubs would qualify for the Senior B by not reaching a certain stage of the main competition.

Since 2010, it has been a proper Tier2 competition, with promotion/relegation to/from the Senior Hurling Championship and from 2015, it has been called the Senior A Hurling Championship.

References

External links
Official Laois Website
Laois on Hoganstand
Laois Club GAA

 
1
Senior hurling county championships